Sabian is a Canadian  cymbal manufacturing company established in 1981 in Meductic, New Brunswick, where it is still headquartered. Sabian is considered one of the big four manufacturers of cymbals, along with Zildjian, Meinl and Paiste.

History

Sabian Cymbals was founded in 1981, by Robert Zildjian, when he had a conflict with his brother Armand after he was not chosen to be the main CEO and successor of Avedis Zildjian. Robert opened Sabian in the small eastern Canadian village of Meductic, New Brunswick. The name 'Sabian' comes from the first two letters of the names of Robert's three children (Sally, Billy, and Andy).

In 1982, Sabian introduced the Automatic Anvil (AA) and the Hand Hammered (HH) lines, producing 45,000 cymbals in the first year.

In 1989, Sabian produced its first signature artist cymbals, the Jack DeJohnette ride/hi-hats, and the Carmine Appice Silver Nickel Chinese. Eight years later, due to rising demand, a larger plant was opened in Meductic.

Sabian introduced the HHX series in 2001 which brought in the Manhattan's darker hammering techniques. In 2011, with the help of Jojo Mayer, Sabian produced the OMNI series, which was the product of years of research and development.

Sabian cymbals are still made in New Brunswick. Robert's son Andy is the most recent president of Sabian. In January 2015, the company announced the acquisition of US cymbal manufacturer, Crescent Cymbals, moving all its production to Sabian's factory in Canada, subsequently incorporating Crescent into its list of brands.

In 2017, Sabian sponsored "The Capital Project Presents: The Final Concert", a music and film event in Fredericton, New Brunswick, making the event free of charge. Refunds were offered to people who had already purchased tickets.

Endorsers
A range of well known drummers from multiple famous bands as well as many newer players across multiple genres play and endorse Sabian, including: 

 
 Neil Peart of Rush 
 Phil Collins of Genesis 
 Chester Thompson of Weather Report and Genesis 
 Gregg Bissonette of David Lee Roth 
Joey Muha
 Steve Hass of Ravi Coltrane Manhattan Transfer Patti Austin and John Scofield
 Kenney Jones of the Faces and the Who
 Terry Bozzio of Frank Zappa 
 Bernard Purdie of Steely Dan 
 Jack DeJohnette of Miles Davis and Herbie Hancock 
 Frankie Banali of Quiet Riot 
 Mick Brown of Dokken  
 Rob Hammersmith of Skid Row 
 Rob Affuso of Skid Row 
 Tony Palermo of Papa Roach 
 Daniel Adair of Nickelback 
 Mike Wengren of Disturbed 
 Shannon Leto of Thirty Seconds to Mars 
 Don Brewer of Grand Funk Railroad 
 Shaun Foist of Breaking Benjamin 
 Dave Abbruzzese of Pearl Jam 
 Alan White of Oasis  
 Dave Weckl, jazz great 
 Jeff Hamilton, jazz great 

 Mike Portnoy of Dream Theater 
 Frank Ferrer of Guns N' Roses 
 Mark Schulman of Foreigner and Pink 
 Shannon Larkin of Godsmack 
 The Rev of Avenged Sevenfold 
 Sean Kinney of Alice in Chains 
 Brandon Barnes of Rise Against 
 Rocky Gray of Evanescence 
 Ray Luzier of Korn 
 José Pasillas of Incubus 
 Gene Hoglan of Testament and Devin Townsend 
 A.J. Pero of Twisted Sister 
 Martin Axenrot of Opeth 
 Pete Sandoval of Morbid Angel 
 Tim Yeung of Morbid Angel 
 George Kollias of Nile 
 Brent Fitz of Slash 
 Aaron Solowoniuk of Billy Talent 
 Stix Zadinia of Steel Panther 
 Matt Abts of Gov't Mule 
 Blake Richardson of Between the Buried and Me 
 Paulina Villarreal of the Warning
 Vinnie Paul of Pantera

References

External links 

 
 Robert Zildjian Interview NAMM Oral History Library (2002)
 Willi Zildjian Interview NAMM Oral History Library (2002)
 Andy Zildjian Interview NAMM Oral History Library (2012)

Percussion instrument manufacturing companies
Cymbal manufacturing companies
Companies based in New Brunswick
Manufacturing companies established in 1981
1981 establishments in New Brunswick
Canadian brands
York County, New Brunswick
Musical instrument manufacturing companies of Canada